III is the fourth studio album by American country music artist Joe Nichols, released on October 25, 2005 by Universal South Records. The album produced Nichols' second #1 hit in "Tequila Makes Her Clothes Fall Off", as well as the top-10 hit "Size Matters (Someday)" and "I'll Wait for You". Overall, it was certified gold by the RIAA for sales of well over 500,000 copies.

"My Old Friend the Blues" is a cover of a Steve Earle song. Also included is "Should I Come Home (Or Should I Go Crazy)", a cover of a Gene Watson hit single.

Brent Rowan produced the album except for the three singles, which were produced by Buddy Cannon, and "Freedom Feels Like Lonely" and "As Country as She Gets", which were produced by Byron Gallimore.

Track listing

Personnel
Adapted from AllMusic:

 Wyatt Beard - backing vocals 
 Tom Bukovac - electric guitar 
 Terry Crisp - pedal steel guitar
 Chad Cromwell - drums
 Dan Dugmore - pedal steel guitar
 Stuart Duncan - fiddle
 Shannon Forrest - drums, percussion
 Larry Franklin - fiddle
 Paul Franklin - pedal steel guitar
 Steve Gibson - acoustic guitar, electric guitar
 Kenny Greenberg - electric guitar
 Rob Hajacos - fiddle
 Morgane Hayes - backing vocals
 Aubrey Haynie - fiddle
 Wes Hightower - backing vocals
 John Hobbs - piano, Wurlitzer
 David Hungate - bass guitar
 Kirk "Jelly Roll" Johnson - harmonica
 Tim Lauer - pump organ
 B. James Lowry - acoustic guitar, resonator guitar
 Gary Lunn - bass  guitar
 Liana Manis - backing vocals
 Brent Mason - electric guitar
 Randy McCormick - keyboards, Hammond organ, piano
 Gordon Mote - Fender Rhodes, Hammond organ, piano, Wurlitzer
 Steve Nathan - Hammond organ, piano
 Larry Paxton - bass guitar
 Al Perkins - pedal steel guitar
 Brent Rowan - bass guitar, acoustic guitar, electric guitar, keyboards
 Bryan Sutton - acoustic guitar, mandolin
 Russell Terrell - backing vocals
 Robby Turner - pedal steel guitar
 Joe Nichols - lead vocals, background vocals

Charts

Weekly charts

Year-end charts

Singles

Certifications

References

2005 albums
Joe Nichols albums
Albums produced by Brent Rowan
Show Dog-Universal Music albums